Anari is a fresh mild whey cheese produced in Cyprus. Although much less known than other Cypriot cheeses (e.g. halloumi), it gained popularity following publicity. One of the main industrial producers on the island won a silver medal award for anari in the 2005 World Cheese Awards in the UK.

Production

The whey used is usually a by-product in the production process of other harder cheeses, commonly that of halloumi or kefalotyri cheese. A small amount of goat or sheep milk (5–10%) can be added at this temperature to improve the end product quality. The temperature is then increased to boiling point, whilst mixing. At  small crumbly curds of anari start forming and are skimmed off the surface using a slotted spoon or a colander. They are placed in a container that allows further drainage and then cut into cubes of roughly 10 cm sides. Excluding the drainage, the above process takes roughly one hour.

Variants

In its simple form, anari has a chalk-white appearance with a very soft consistency, similar in many ways to the likes of mizithra cheese, cottage cheese and ricotta. Salt is often added and the product dried through gentle heating (in bygone times it was just left in the sun) and further maturation to create an extremely hard variant.

Culinary uses

If not intended for hardening, anari must be consumed soon after its production as it is very perishable. Most locals will consume it for breakfast mixed with syrups (usually carob based) or honey.
Bourekia is a traditional Cypriot dish of pastries packed with various anari-based fillings (savoury and sweet).
Cheesecakes are similar to bourekia but with a filo pastry cover instead.
Dry anari is too hard to cut and is hence invariably grated and used to garnish pasta dishes or thicken sauces. It is also used to make Flaounes (Φλαούνες) which is a traditional pastry with dry anari prepared in Orthodox Easter.

Nutritional facts

100 g of commercially produced fresh anari has a typical composition of:

Other 
Anari is also known in Cyprus as analati anari meaning "unsalted anari", since the regular anari is salted. Also anari has a prominent place in Cypriot culture as it is mentioned in the traditional fairy tale Spanos and the forty dragons.

See also 

Ricotta salata – another pressed whey cheese

References

Goat's-milk cheeses
Sheep's-milk cheeses
Cypriot cheeses
Whey cheeses